The Wafflemat foundation system, also called a waffle slab foundation, is an above-ground mat foundation used to provide load-bearing capacity on expansive, rocky, compressible, or hydro collapsible soils. The completed slab then sits on the ground as a 'raft', with the void areas underneath the slab allowing for soil movement.

The waffle slab is very stiff, with the cross section providing the needed strength to resist differential swelling resulting from landscaping practices, surface drainage, or flooding from any source. It does not require presoaking underlying soil pads, and there is no need for footings, meaning no earth spoils.

Current design practice provides post-tensioned on-grade slabs with stiffness equal to or better than other post-tensioned slab types, but with less susceptibility to swell pressures exerted by expansive soils. An on-grade Wafflemat foundation provides all of the elements of the in-ground rib and uniform thickness slabs, but with greater performance provided by its geometry and smaller contact area with the soils.

Building code considerations
 The Wafflemat foundation system adheres to International Building Code and PTI requirements. By 2008, most states put into effect the changes adopted in the 2006 IBC and, in regards to foundations, the on-grade mat foundation has become a more attractive design because, as an engineered system, it already accommodates the 2008 design recommendations. Also, in 2008, the Post-Tensioning Institute (PTI) approved two key specifications for waffle-slab foundations and incorporated them into the PTI Manual, which is frequently referenced by building codes for post-tensioned slab design.

Performance of an on-grade mat foundation

Structural considerations

An engineer designing an on-grade slab makes the same calculations and follows the same requirements used in the design of traditional post-tensioned slabs on grade, and then applies them to the on-grade mat foundation ensuring the system possesses equal or greater stiffness.

Geotechnical considerations
The higher contact pressures along the base of the ribs and the voids, or low pressure areas in the system, limit deformations of soil due to moisture variation to the void spaces, reducing the impact of the soil's volume change on the on-grade mat slabs.

Environmental considerations
Environmental engineers note reduced carbon and/or other air quality emissions are usually of the same magnitude as the reduction in concrete needed for any foundation project.  Since use of the on-grade Wafflemat foundation system typically results in a 20%–30% reduction in concrete, a similar or even greater reduction in these other emissions will also occur. Because a Wafflemat foundation system uses less raw materials (cement, steel, fuel, aggregate, and sand) than alternative slab-on-grade and/or deep foundations, it is also more environmentally sustainable.

In addition to the lowering of CO2, the Wafflebox forms are made of recycled polypropylene plastic, and are a very 'green' material. This contributes, and adds to, the environmental benefits delivered by the system.

The Wafflemat system has been recognized by several organizations for its environmental advantages, including the Breath California Award for Environmental Excellence.

Commercial Acceptance 
After nearly 20 years of Research and Development, the initial and current design of the Wafflemat foundation system was installed in 1,100 homes in Northern California from 1993 to 1995. Since that time, over  has been installed in projects from the west coast of the US to east coast, and from Texas in the south to the Dakotas in the north. Production facilities for the Waffleboxes are located in California, Texas, and Monterrey, Mexico.

See also
 Waffle slab

References

Ground Supported Post Tensioned Waffle Slab, Dr. Bijan Aaiami, San Francisco State University, 1995
Geotechnical Investigation, Richland Homes, Purcell, Rhoades, & Associates, 1997
Geotechnical engineering state of the art and practice keynote lectures from GeoCongress 2012. Kyle M. Rollins., Va.: American Society of Civil Engineers, 2012. 
Reynolds, Henry Raymond. Practical Problems in Foundations. London: C. Lockwood, 1960. Print.

External links
Waffle Slabs Provide Superior Performance
What is a Waffle Slab Foundation?
Lowering the Carbon Footprint with Wafflemat
Saving Thousands of Gallons of Water with Wafflemat
Wafflemat Earns Clean Air Award in Green Building
Structural Engineering Case Study: Wafflemat Slab On Grade PT Foundation System

Shallow foundations